Two ships of the Imperial Russian Navy have been named Oslyabya after the Russian monk who participated in the Battle of Kulikovo.

  - 45-gun steam frigate sold for scrap in 1874
  -  pre-dreadnought battleship sunk by the Japanese during the Battle of Tsushima in 1905.
  -  landing ship in active service since 1981.

Russian Navy ship names